Live! Live! Live! is a live album released by Bryan Adams through A&M Records in 1988. It was recorded live at the Rock Werchter festival on 3 July 1988 in Werchter, Belgium. One track, "Into the Fire", was recorded live in Tokyo. The album sold over 1 million copies.
The concert was taped while it "rained in torrents". At the end of It's Only Love, Adams comments to the audience, "I've got to tell you something. For you people to sit out in the rain, means you're one hell of an audience. I mean, to sit out in this..."

Track listing

Certifications

References 

Bryan Adams albums
1994 live albums
A&M Records live albums